Kenworthy James "Ken" Thompson (1895–1931) was a British-born Canadian professional ice hockey player. After playing several seasons of amateur hockey in Montreal, Thompson played two seasons of professional hockey for the Montreal Wanderers. He joined the Wanderers for the 1916–17 season, the final one of the National Hockey Association, and played one game for them in the new National Hockey League before retiring from hockey. He was born in Oakengates, Shropshire, United Kingdom.

Playing career
Thompson played 14 games for the Wanderers in 1916–17 in the last year of the NHA. The following season Thompson and the Wanderers franchise would be playing in the start-up National Hockey League. He played one game in the NHL, on December 26, 1917 against the Ottawa Senators.

Prior to his professional career, he played in various amateur teams:

Montreal HLP
Université Laval
All-Montreal

Career statistics

Regular season and playoffs

See also
List of National Hockey League players from the United Kingdom
List of players who played only one game in the NHL

External links

References

Notes

1895 births
1931 deaths
English ice hockey left wingers
Montreal Wanderers (NHA) players
Montreal Wanderers (NHL) players
Montreal Wanderers players
People from Oakengates
Ice hockey people from Montreal
Université Laval alumni